Remixes Compiled is a compilation album of remixes done by Telefon Tel Aviv, an American electronic music duo consisting of Joshua Eustis and Charles Cooper. It was released on Hefty Records in 2007.

Critical reception

Marc Hogan of Pitchfork said, "Telefon Tel Aviv's remixes are all extensions of a common aesthetic, a fact that's particularly remarkable if you grew up with the idea of these comps as schizophrenic cash-ins full of your favorite rock group's DJ-tweaked B-sides."

Track listing

References

External links
 

2007 remix albums
Telefon Tel Aviv albums
Hefty Records albums